Patrick Fabian (born 11 October 1987) is a German retired professional footballer who played as a centre-back.

Career 
Fabian was born in Hagen. He made his debut on the professional league level in the Bundesliga with VfL Bochum on 14 February 2009 when he came on as a 90th-minute substitute in a game against Schalke 04. Over the course of his career Fabian suffered four separate anterior cruciate ligament injuries.

Career statistics

References

External links
 

1987 births
Living people
German footballers
Association football central defenders
VfL Bochum players
VfL Bochum II players
Bundesliga players
2. Bundesliga players
Regionalliga players
Oberliga (football) players
Sportspeople from Hagen
Footballers from North Rhine-Westphalia